The University of Medical Technology, Yangon (formerly, the Institute of Paramedical Science, Yangon) is one of three universities of medical technology in Myanmar. The university offers four-year Bachelor of Medical Technology (B.Med.Tech) and two-year Master of Medical Technology (M.Med.Tech) degree programs in physiotherapy, medical laboratory technology and medical imaging technology. The university accepts approximately undergraduate 150 students annually. It is situated at Lower Mingaladon Road in Insein Township.

History
Formal paramedical education in Myanmar began in 1964 when a paramedical diploma course in accordance with the guidelines set by the College of Radiographers, UK, was introduced. This was part of an international technical assistance program—the Colombo Plan, and was available until 1986. The Institute of Paramedical Science, Yangon was formally established in 1993. It was the only institute in the country until the founding of the Institute of Medical Technology, Mandalay in 2002.

Programs
The university offers two-year diploma and four-year bachelor's degree programs in radiography, physiotherapy, and medical technology.

See also
 University of Medical Technology, Mandalay
 Defence Services Institute of Nursing and Paramedical Science

References

Universities and colleges in Yangon
Medical schools in Myanmar